In the mathematical field of category theory, FinSet is the category whose objects are all finite sets and whose morphisms are all functions between them. FinOrd is the category whose objects are all finite ordinal numbers and whose morphisms are all functions between 
them.

Properties 
FinSet is a full subcategory of Set, the category whose objects are all sets and whose morphisms are all functions. Like Set, FinSet is a large category.

FinOrd is a full subcategory of FinSet as by the standard definition, suggested by John von Neumann, each ordinal is the well-ordered set of all smaller ordinals. Unlike Set and FinSet, FinOrd is a small category.

FinOrd is a skeleton of FinSet. Therefore, FinSet and FinOrd are equivalent categories.

Topoi 
Like Set, FinSet and FinOrd are topoi. As in Set, in FinSet the categorical product of two objects A and B is given by the cartesian product , the categorical sum is given by the disjoint union , and the exponential object BA is given by the set of all functions with domain A and codomain B. In FinOrd, the categorical product of two objects n and m is given by the ordinal product , the categorical sum is given by the ordinal sum , and the exponential object is given by the ordinal exponentiation nm. The subobject classifier in FinSet and FinOrd is the same as in Set. FinOrd is an example of a PRO.

See also 
 General set theory
 Lawvere theory
 Natural number object
 Simplex category
 FinVect

References 
 Robert Goldblatt (1984). Topoi, the Categorial Analysis of Logic (Studies in logic and the foundations of mathematics, 98). North-Holland. Reprinted 2006 by Dover Publications, and available online at Robert Goldblatt's homepage.

Categories in category theory